The 1971 Svenska Cupen final took place on 30 June 1971  at Malmö Stadion in Malmö. The match was contested by Allsvenskan sides Malmö FF and Åtvidabergs FF. Åtvidaberg played their second consecutive final and their third final in total, Malmö FF played their first final since 1967 and their eighth final in total. Åtvidaberg won their second title with a 3–2 victory.

Match details

External links
Svenska Cupen at svenskfotboll.se

1971
Cupen
Malmö FF matches
Åtvidabergs FF matches
June 1971 sports events in Europe
Sports competitions in Malmö
1970s in Malmö